Howard Hillman is an author specializing in travel, cooking, and wine, including a book on kitchen science that has seen three editions. He is a graduate of Harvard Business School, and has published over 25 books. He maintains an extensive website on "Hillman Wonders of the World." He wrote the "longest article ever to appear in The New York Times Travel Section."

Books 
 The Diner's Guide to Wines (1978)
 The Book of World Cuisines (1979)
The Cook's Book (1981)
Kitchen Science: A Guide to Knowing the Hows and Whys for Fun and Success in the Kitchen, (1981).
Revised ed.: Kitchen Science: A Guide to Knowing the Hows and Whys for Fun and Success in the Kitchen, (1989). 
Revised/updated ed.: The New Kitchen Science: A Guide to Knowing the Hows and Whys for Fun and Success in the Kitchen, (2003). 
The Gourmet Guide to Beer (1983, 1988)
Great Peasant Dishes of the World aka Great Peasant Dishes (1983)
Art of Dining Out (1984)
Howard Hillman's Kitchen Secrets (1985)

References

External links 
Hillman Wonders of the World
Howard Hillman short bio at Houghton Mifflin

American food writers
American travel writers
American male non-fiction writers
Harvard Business School alumni
Living people
Year of birth missing (living people)